Kiss to the Brain is an album by the rock band Helios Creed. It was released through Amphetamine Reptile Records. Songs from the supporting tour were released on Your Choice Live Series.

Critical reception

Trouser Press determined that "the guitar pops up as more than just a guidepost, and the contrast makes the moments of otherworldly radio static, menacing vocoder distortions and sci-fi freakouts all the more effective."

AllMusic wrote: "This is still not anywhere near mainstream hard rock—there's plenty of bizarre lyrics and spacy sound effects, even on the hard rock songs—but it does display that Helios Creed has the ability to create more than unstructured sonic explorations."

Track listing

Personnel 
Musicians
Helios Creed – vocals, guitar, sampler, production
Paul Kirk – bass guitar
Paul Della Pelle – drums
Z Sylver – synthesizer, sampler, vocals
Production and additional personnel
Krystl Chamber – additional vocals
Matt Kelley – production, engineering

References

External links 
 

Helios Creed albums
1992 albums
Amphetamine Reptile Records albums